Sir Archibald Mitchelson, 1st Baronet (1 April 1878 – 30 December 1945) was a British investment banker.

He was chairman of Mitchelson Partners Ltd, as well as D. Davis & Sons Ltd, the shipbuilders J. Samuel White & Co Ltd, Old Silkstone Collieries Ltd, Admiralty Collieries Ltd, North's Navigation Collieries Ltd, Wharncliffe Collieries Ltd, Yorkshire Collieries Ltd, Great Universal Stores Ltd, Anglo-Continental Guano Works Ltd, Pangnga River Tin Concessions Ltd, Genatosan Ltd, and Kamunting Tin Dredging Ltd. He was also president of Porcupine-Davidson Gold Mines Ltd of Ontario and a director of a number of other companies.

He was created a baronet in the 1920 Birthday Honours.

Footnotes

External links

1878 births
1945 deaths
British bankers
Baronets in the Baronetage of the United Kingdom
People from South Shields
Businesspeople from Tyne and Wear